Daniel T. Brennan (born 1 October 1962) is a Canadian former professional National Hockey League player. He played eight games for the Los Angeles Kings during the 1983–84 and 1985–86 seasons, recording one assist and nine minutes in penalties. Brennan played college hockey at the University of North Dakota.

Career statistics

Regular season and playoffs

Awards and honours

References

External links
 

1962 births
Living people
Canadian ice hockey forwards
Ice hockey people from British Columbia
Los Angeles Kings draft picks
Los Angeles Kings players
NCAA men's ice hockey national champions
New Haven Nighthawks players
North Dakota Fighting Hawks men's ice hockey players
People from Dawson Creek